The 2017 VTB United League Playoffs were the concluding games of the 2016–17 VTB United League to determine the season champions. The Playoffs started on May 1, 2017. The champions or the runners-up of the Playoffs qualified for the 2017–18 EuroLeague (depending on the spot of automatically qualified CSKA Moscow).

Format

In the playoffs, a best-of-five games format is used. The team that wins the series will be the first team to win three games. The first two games will be played on the playing court of the four highest-place teams, the third game and, if necessary, the fourth, will be played  on the playing court of the next four highest-place teams and the fifth game, if necessary, will be played on the playing court of the four highest-place teams.

Qualified teams

Bracket

Quarterfinals

|}

Game 1

Game 2

Game 3

Game 4

Semifinals

|}

Game 1

Game 2

Game 3

Game 4

Game 5

Finals

|}

Game 1

Game 2

Game 3

References

Playoffs
2017
2016–17 in Russian basketball
2016–17 in Latvian basketball
2016–17 in Kazakhstani basketball